Notodonta tritophus, the three-humped prominent, is a moth of the family Notodontidae. The species was first described by Michael Denis and Ignaz Schiffermüller in 1775. It is found in most of Europe (although it is a very rare immigrant Great Britain), east to the Caucasus and Armenia.

The wingspan is 45–55 mm. Adults are on wing from April to August in two generations in western Europe.

The larvae mainly feed on Populus species, mainly aspen (Populus tremula), and sometimes willows (Salix species) and birch (Betula species). Larvae can be found from June to September. The species overwinters in the pupal stage.

Subspecies
Notodonta tritophus tritophus
Notodonta tritophus irfana (de Freina, 1983)

External links

Fauna Europaea
Lepidoptera of Belgium
Lepiforum e.V.
De Vlinderstichting 

Notodontidae
Moths described in 1775
Moths of Asia
Moths of Europe
Taxa named by Michael Denis
Taxa named by Ignaz Schiffermüller